Downing is an English surname.

List of people with the surname

 Antoinette Downing (1904–2001), Rhode Island architectural historian and preservationist
 Andrew Jackson Downing (1815–1852), American landscape designer, horticulturalist and writer
 Arthur Matthew Weld Downing (1850–1917), Irish astronomer
 Ben Downing (writer) (born 1967), American writer
 Benjamin W. Downing (1835–1894), American lawyer
 Brian Downing (born 1950), American baseball player
 Burton Downing (1885–1929), American racing cyclist
 Caroline Lowder Downing (fl. 1912), British suffragette, sister of Edith Downing
 Charles Downing (died 1845), American politician
 Charles Downing (pomologist) (1802–1885), American pomologist and horticulturalist
 Charles W. Downing Jr. (1825–1862), Florida politician
 Coe S. Downing (1791–1847), New York politician
 Dean Downing (born 1975), English bicycle racer
 Edith Downing (1857–1931), British artist and suffragette
 Finis E. Downing (1846–1936), American politician
 Frank Downing (1907–1978), Australian politician
 Sir George Downing, 1st Baronet (1625–1684), Irish soldier and statesman
 George Maxwell Downing (born 1963), British entrepreneur 
 George Downing (surfer) (1930–2018), American surfer
 Greg Downing (born 1985), American professional lacrosse player
 Jack G. Downing (1940–2021), Central Intelligence Agency deputy director
 James W. Downing (1914–2018), American naval officer
 Jared Downing (born 1989), American mixed martial artist
 Jim Downing (born 1942), American racing driver, owner, and developer
 Jim Downing (Gaelic footballer) (1946–2012), Irish Gaelic footballer
 K. K. Downing (born 1951), guitarist and songwriter
 Keith Downing (born 1965), English former footballer
 Ken Downing (1917–2004), British racing driver
 Lewis Downing (1823–1872), Native American chief of the Cherokee nation
 Lisa Downing (born 1974), British author and academic
 Michael Downing (director), Canadian film director
 Michael Downing (politician) (1955-2015), American politician
 Paul Downing (1873–1944), American college football player and head coach
 Reg Downing (1904–1994), Australian politician
 Russell Downing (born 1978), English cycling road-racer
 Sara Downing (born 1979), American actress
 Stephen Downing (born 1938), American screenwriter, producer, activist, and journalist
 Stewart Downing (born 1984), English footballer
 Thomas Downing, several people
 Timothy J. Downing (born 1979), American attorney, politician, judge, and U.S. Army officer
 Walt Downing (born 1956), American football player
 Wayne A. Downing (1940–2007), US Army four-star general

See also
 Downing baronets, an extinct title in the Baronetage of England and Ireland
 Dineen (surname)
 Downes (surname)
 Dunning (surname)

English-language surnames